Ita Solomon Enang  (born 23 August 1962) is the Senior Special Assistant (SSA) to President Muhammadu Buhari on Niger Delta Affairs. He previously served as Senior Special Assistant to President Muhammadu Buhari on National Assembly Matters (Senate) from 27 August 2015 to 29 May 2019. He is a Nigerian politician who represents the Itu and Ibiono Ibom Federal Constituency of Akwa Ibom State in the House of Representatives from 1999 to 2011. He was elected Senator for the Akwa Ibom North East Senatorial District (Uyo) from 2011 to 2015.

Senator Ita Enang was appointed as the SSA to President Muhammadu Buhari on Niger Delta Affairs on a letter of appointment dated 14 August 2019, which took effect from 29 May 2019.

Background

Ita Solomon Enang was born on 23 August 1962.
He attended the Presbyterian Teachers Training College, Ididep, Akwa Ibom State (1974-1979). 
He was admitted to the University of Calabar, Calabar in 1980 where he read Law, graduating in 1984.
He went on to the Nigerian Law School, Lagos and was called to the Nigerian Bar in 1985.
He then entered private practice with his own law firm.

Political career

Enang became a councilor in 1987, and a member of the Akwa Ibom State house of assembly in 1992.
He was elected to the House of Representatives in 1999. 
He served three terms as a member of the House of Representatives.
His election to represent the Ibiono Ibom/Itu Federal Constituency in April 2007 was nullified in December 2007 by an Election Petition Tribunal sitting in Uyo.
He was eventually reelected on 20 January 2010.

Enang worked toward abolition of the onshore/offshore dichotomy, ensuring that his state of Akwa Ibom became the highest earner of oil revenue in the country.
As the federal representative for Itu/Ibiono, Enang was appointed Chairman of the House Committee on Business and Rules.

Running in April 2011 for the Senate seat of Uyo (North east) Akwa Ibom on the People's Democratic Party (PDP) platform, Enang won with 160,942 votes. The runner up was Nsima Edem Umoh of the Action Congress of Nigeria (ACN) with 121,965 votes.

References

Living people
1962 births
People from Uyo
Peoples Democratic Party members of the Senate (Nigeria)
University of Calabar alumni
Nigerian Law School alumni
20th-century Nigerian lawyers
Akwa Ibom State politicians